Corynofrea mirabilis is a species of beetle in the family Cerambycidae. It was described by Per Olof Christopher Aurivillius in 1910 and is known from the Republic of the Congo.

References

Crossotini
Beetles described in 1910